The mottled conger moray, sometimes called mulatto conger, is a moray eel of the genus Enchelycore, distributed across the Atlantic and Pacific Oceans. Its length is up to 100 centimeters.

References

nigricans
Fish of the Atlantic Ocean
Fish described in 1788
Fish of the Dominican Republic
Fish of the Caribbean